Azucar Negra is a studio album by the Cuban salsa singer Celia Cruz. It was nominated for a Grammy Award for Best Tropical Latin Album, Vocal or Instrumental in 1994.

Critical reception

The Chicago Tribune called the album "a truly sweet and artfully balanced mix of many worlds: a smart international pan-Latin style that draws on classic salsa, new Latin pop." The Los Angeles Times noted that "though representative of Cruz's well-known style, it allows room for a more pop-oriented presence."

Track listing

Chart positions

References

Celia Cruz albums
1993 albums